Rabbit Transit is a video game made for the Atari 2600 with the Starpath Supercharger add-on. It was published by Starpath in 1983. A prototype of an Atari-branded cartridge version exists, not requiring the Supercharger.

It is also a 1974 looney tunes cartoon directed by Tunes freleng

References

1983 video games
Atari 2600 games
Atari 2600-only games
Starpath games
Video games developed in the United States